Amolops jaunsari, also known as the Jaunsar stream frog or Jaunsar's torrent frog, is a species of frog endemic to India. It is only known from its type locality near Chakrata in Uttarakhand (formerly Uttar Pradesh). It was described based on a single specimen collected in 1985 and has not been recorded ever since.

Description
Amolops jaunsari is a relatively small species of Amolops. The head is wider than it is long. The eyes are relatively large. The tympanum is distinct and the supratympanic fold is present. The fingers have distinct terminal discs. The toe discs are similar to the fingers ones. The dorsum is dark olive green. The upper lip has light brown and lighter spots. The iris is golden brown. A blackish band runs from the eye to the sacrum. The limbs have dark and light brown crossbars. The throat and the anterior part of the breast have dark brown mottling.

Habitat and conservation
The threats to this poorly-known species are unknown.

References

jaunsari
Frogs of India
Endemic fauna of India
Amphibians described in 1992